Sir Nicholas Barton Harvey (born 3 August 1961) is a British Liberal Democrat politician. He was the member of parliament (MP) for North Devon from 1992 to 2015 and the Minister of State for the Armed Forces from 2010 to 2012.

Early life and education
Harvey was born in Chandler's Ford, Hampshire, and was educated at Queen's College, an independent school in the county town of Taunton in Somerset. He then attended the Middlesex Polytechnic at Enfield where he was awarded a BA degree in business studies in 1983. He was the president of the students' union from 1981 to 1982.

Early career
He joined Profil PR Ltd in 1984 as a communications and marketing executive, before being appointed by the public relations firm Dewe Rogerson (now known as Citigate Dewe Rogerson) as a marketing executive in 1986. He worked as a communications consultant from 1991 until his election to parliament.

Parliamentary career
He was elected as the vice-chairman of the Union of Liberal Students for a year in 1981. He unsuccessfully contested the London Borough of Enfield seat of Enfield Southgate at the 1987 general election. He finished in second place some 18,345 votes behind the then government whip Michael Portillo. He was elected to the House of Commons for North Devon at the 1992 general election by defeating the Conservative MP, Antony Speller, who had ended the parliamentary career of former Liberal leader Jeremy Thorpe in the same seat at the 1979 general election. Harvey won the seat with a majority of just 794, but remained the MP there until 2015. He made his maiden speech on 11 May 1992.

He was made a spokesman on transport in 1992 by Paddy Ashdown, before being moved to speak on trade and industry in 1994. He became the spokesman on constitutional affairs following the 1997 general election. He became a member the front bench team under Charles Kennedy in 1999 when he became the party's health spokesperson. After the 2001 general election, he became the Liberal Democrat spokesperson for culture, media and sport until he stood down in 2003 to spend more time with his young family. He was a member of both the home affairs select committee and the standards and privileges committee since the 2005 general election. He was the vice-chairman of the all party group on beer. Until 2009, in addition to his career as an MP, he devoted time to advising a commercial public relations agency, Harrison Cowley, for which he declared an annual income of up to £10,000.

After the 2010 general election, as part of the Liberal Democrat – Conservative coalition, he was made minister for the armed forces. After the September 2012 reshuffle, he was knighted as a Knight Bachelor.

He was also a member of the public bill committee for the Defence Reform Act 2014.

He lost his seat in the General Election 2015 by 6,936 votes. He contested the seat unsuccessfully in the General Election 2017, increasing his vote by 8.6%, but falling 4,332 votes short.

Corporate career
After leaving Parliament, he was chair of the trustees of the Joseph Rowntree Reform Trust and worked for Global Partners, where he was an adviser on Egypt and Jordan.

In August 2017, he was appointed interim chief executive of the Liberal Democrats, following the resignation of Tim Gordon. He was appointed as permanent Chief Executive on 28 November 2018, but stood down less than a year later.

Political views
He was the only Liberal Democrat MP to vote against the Maastricht Treaty in 1992 and was a critic of Liberal Democratic leader Charles Kennedy, having called into question his "political direction" and "leadership skills". He returned to the front bench as defence spokesperson under Kennedy's successor, Sir Menzies Campbell. He voted against the Iraq War and called repeatedly for troops to be withdrawn under a phased timetable. He also voted against the government's decision to renew Britain's nuclear deterrent, Trident.

Personal life
Harvey married Kate Harvey in May 2003 in North Devon. They have a daughter born in 2002 and a son born in 2004.

Notes

External links
 
 

1961 births
Alumni of Middlesex University
Liberal Democrats (UK) MPs for English constituencies
Living people
People educated at Queen's College, Taunton
People from Chandler's Ford
UK MPs 1992–1997
UK MPs 1997–2001
UK MPs 2001–2005
UK MPs 2005–2010
UK MPs 2010–2015
Knights Bachelor
Politicians awarded knighthoods